The Robertson Scholars Leadership Program is a joint merit scholarship and leadership development program at Duke University and the University of North Carolina at Chapel Hill. The scholarship offers participants a unique "dual citizenship" at both Duke University and UNC-Chapel Hill. Approximately 25-30 students are selected from the pool of applicants to both universities.

History and background
The program was created in 2000 by benefactor Julian Robertson, a 1955 graduate of UNC-Chapel Hill. Mr. Robertson sought to encourage collaboration between Duke and the University of North Carolina and to promote the development of young leaders. His initial $24 million gift as well as his subsequent gifts to the program and the universities are overseen by a Board of Directors including Duke University President Vincent E. Price, UNC-Chapel Hill Chancellor Kevin Guskiewicz, and Julian Robertson himself.

The program covers four years of undergraduate tuition, mandatory fees, room and board, and provides recipients full funding for three summer experiences. The summer components of the program have served as a model for DukeEngage, an initiative to offer the opportunity for summer research and internships to all Duke undergraduates.

Robertson Scholars are required to spend the second semester of their sophomore year at the sister campus and may attend classes at the sister campus throughout their undergraduate career.

Participants have regularly won Truman Scholarships and Fulbright Fellowships.

Program timeline

Orientation retreat
Shortly before the start of first-year fall semester, incoming Scholars participate in a leadership retreat facilitated by instructors from the National Outdoor Leadership School (NOLS) at the Nantahala Outdoor Center in Bryson City, North Carolina.

First-year dinner series
First-year Scholars develop practical life skills and discuss a wide range of subjects with guest speakers. Topics have included public speaking, presentation skills, personal finances, etiquette, and networking.

Colloquium
Colloquium is a one-semester course taken during the Scholar's first year. It provides a forum to discuss issues impacting society at large and ethical challenges facing today's leaders. This course offers Scholars a chance to develop an ethical framework for leading and provides a unique, Robertson-only space to strengthen intellectual ties among the class.

Campus Switch
During the second semester of their sophomore year, Robertson Scholars live and take classes on their sister campus. The Campus Switch is designed to build stronger educational and community ties between UNC-Chapel Hill and Duke, and to offer Scholars the opportunity to adjust to new situations and thrive in challenging environments.

Senior Capstone
The Robertson Senior Capstone Experience is designed to support senior scholars in their transition from college to the next stage of their careers. The Capstone includes a winter retreat and a dinner series that combines reflection on their four-year experience with conversations with Robertson alumni and other young leaders.

Summer experiences

Community Summer
Scholars spend the summer after their first year living together and participating in community service internships in the United States. Past locations have included Cleveland, Mississippi, New Orleans, Louisiana, and Whitesburg, Kentucky. This summer is designed to strengthen scholars' relationships with each other and to increase awareness of the social and economic challenges of various geographic regions in the US.

Exploration Summer
Scholars spend the summer after sophomore year exploring their academic or cultural interests, either domestically or internationally. Scholars can participate in a university-sponsored program, or they can propose a self-designed project to pursue individually or with other students.

Launch Summer
Scholars spend the summer after junior year engaged in an independent, self-designed project intended to focus their interests and launch them into life after college. Projects have included research for honors theses, pre-professional internships, and expansions of work undertaken in previous Robertson summers.

References

External links 
 Robertson Scholars Leadership Program
 Robertson Foundation

Duke University
University of North Carolina at Chapel Hill
Scholarships in the United States
2000 establishments in North Carolina